The Esmé Quartet is a string quartet, formed in 2016 at the Hochschule für Musik und Tanz in Cologne, Germany by four Korean musicians. The members were long ago acquainted with each other as friends. They shared common interests and passions in music, the arts, and life. The quartet has rapidly gained a reputation as a chamber ensemble of exceptional achievement and promise.

In spring 2018, the quartet won first prize and four special prizes (Alan Bradley Mozart-Prize, Bram Eldering Beethoven-Prize, the ProQuartet Prize and Prize of the Esterházy Foundation) at the prestigious Wigmore Hall International String Quartet Competition in London, and in autumn 2018, it became HSBC Laureate of the Académie du Festival d’Aix. This recognition followed prizes at the Trondheim International Chamber Music Competition, Irene-Steels Wilsing String Quartet Competition and the 55th Possehl Musik Preis Lübeck Germany.

The Esmé Quartet has appeared at St Martin-in-the-Fields, the Flagey Musiq3 Festival in Brussels, and as a resident quartet at the 2018 Aix-en-Provence festival, the 2018 McGill International String Quartet Academy in Montreal and Classic Esterházy in Eisenstadt. The quartet has participated in the ProQuartet Academy in Roussillon (France) in 2017 and in the 2017 Jeunesses Musicales International Chamber Music Campus in Weikersheim, where it was awarded a special prize in the form of a residency at the 2019 Heidelberger Streichquartettfest.

The ensemble takes its name from an Old French word meaning ‘loved‘ or ‘esteemed‘.

Members
The members are:

 Wonhee Bae, first violin
 Yuna Ha, second violin
 Jiwon Kim, viola
 Ye-eun Heo, violoncello.

References

String quartets